The Tour of California (officially sponsored as the Amgen Tour of California) was an annual professional road cycling stage race on the UCI World Tour and USA Cycling Professional Tour that ran from 2006 to 2019. It was the only event on the top-level World Tour in the United States. The eight-day race covered 650–700 miles (1,045–1,126 km) through the U.S. state of California.

A typical edition might begin in the Sierra Nevada in northern California, travel through the Redwood forests, California's Wine Country and the Pacific Coast, and finish in southern California. The 2009 race crossed the Central Valley from Merced to Fresno, with an excursion through the Sierra Nevada foothills, before crossing over to the coast.

With eight or nine of the 20 UCI ProTour teams (known as ProTeams) usually racing, the Tour of California was one of the most important cycling races in the United States. On November 28, 2006, the UCI upgraded it from 2.1 (category 1) to 2.HC (English: beyond category), the highest rating for races on the UCI Continental Circuits; the Tour of Utah is the only other 2.HC race as of 2019. On August 2, 2016, the UCI upgraded the race to World Tour status and added it to the 2017 UCI World Tour schedule.

The race was originally staged in February, but the 2010 Tour of California was moved to May, the same time that the Giro d'Italia is held. At the time of the move it was considered likely that the number of Americans in the Giro and Italians in the Tour of California would decrease. Tour of California organizers sought to make the race a preparatory event for the Tour de France, believing few riders who seek a serious position in the Tour would ride the Giro. Since the change in schedule, the race continued to be held in May.

The tour was sponsored by Amgen, a California-based biotechnology company most famous for developing the anti anemia drug Erythropoietin (EPO), which has been used by professional cyclists in several blood doping scandals. No plans have been announced regarding if or when the tour will return.

General Classification Results 
The leader and overall winner by time after each stage and at the conclusion of the race wore a Yellow Jersey. Originally the leader's jersey was gold, a reference to the California Gold Rush, but in 2009 the jersey color was changed to yellow.

Records and Jerseys

Most Stage Victories 
, 17 (2019: 1; 2017: 1; 2016: 2; 2015: 2; 2014: 1; 2013: 2; 2012: 5; 2011: 1; 2010: 2)
, 10 (2016: 1; 2015: 4; 2014: 2; 2010; 2009: 2)
, 6 (2011; 2009; 2008; 2007: 2; 2006: 1)
, 5 (2008; 2007: 2; 2006: 2)
, 3 (2018)
, 3 (2008; 2006: 2)
, 3 (2018; 2016; 2015)
, 3 (2012; 2011; 2010)
, 2 (2018)
, 2 (2006: 2)
, 2 (2009; 2008)
, 2 (2013; 2007)
, 2 (2012; 2008)
, 2 (2016; 2014)
, 2 (2016; 2015)
, 2 (2017)

Most Days in Leader's Jersey 
, 22 days (2009: 7; 2008: 5; 2007: 8; 2006: 2)
, 10 days (2019: 4; 2018: 2; 2013: 4)
, 8 days (2019: 1; 2016: 1; 2015: 2; 2012: 4)
, 7 days (2014: 7)
, 6 days (2016: 5; 2015: 1)
, 5 days (2006: 5)
, 5 days (2011: 5)
, 4 days (2018)
, 4 days (2015: 2; 2014: 1; 2010; 1)
, 4 days (2010: 4)
, 4 days (2010: 2; 2012: 2)
, 4 days (2017: 4)

Sprints Classification 
The leader and overall winner by points from intermediate and final sprints wears the Green Jersey.

Sprint Winners

Most Days in Green Jersey 
, 42 days (2019: 2; 2017: 5; 2016: 8; 2014: 4; 2013: 5; 2012: 8; 2011: 6; 2010: 4)
, 18 days (2015: 8; 2014: 3; 2010: 3; 2009: 4)
, 6 days (2007: 4; 2006: 2)
, 5 days (2019) 
, 4 days (2018)
, 4 days (2006)
, 4 days (2008)
, 4 days (2009)
, 3 days (2007)
, 3 days (2013)

Mountains Classification 
The leader and overall winner by points in mountain climbs is awarded the Red Jersey (Orange in the past, before 2009) and is known as the race's King of the Mountains or "KOM."

KOM Winners

Most Days in Mountains Jersey 
, 8 days (2013)
, 8 days (2014)
, 7 days (2016)
, 6 days (2009)
, 6 days (2012)
, 6 days (2017)
, 6 days (2018; 2, 2015; 4)
, 5 days (2006)
, 5 days (2008)
, 5 days (2010)
, 5 days (2011)
, 4 days (2018)
, 4 days (2007)
, 4 days (2019)
, 3 days (2006)
, 3 days (2007)

Best Young Rider Classification 
The leader and overall winner by time for riders under 23 is awarded the White Jersey. Before 2009, this jersey was silver and blue.

Best Young Rider Winners

Most Days in Youth Jersey 
, 16 days (2009: 8; 2008: 5; 2007: 3)
, 14 days (2014: 7; 2013: 7)
, 13 days (2012: 4; 2011: 2; 2010: 7)
, 7 days (2018)
, 6 days (2006)
, 6 days (2015)
, 6 days (2016)
, 6 days (2019)
, 5 days (2017)
, 4 days (2011)
, 3 days (2007)

Teams Classification 
Teams are classified based on the total time of the team's top three finishers in each stage.

Best Team Winners

Most Courageous Rider Classification 
The Blue Jersey is given to the most courageous rider at the end of each stage. In 2008, the jersey was red. George Hincapie has won this jersey three times, after stages in 2008, 2009 and 2010. Jan Bárta won the award twice during the 2011 edition. Ben Wolfe and Evan Huffman both won the jersey twice during the 2017 race. No one else has won this jersey more than once.

Doping controversy 

The main sponsor of the event, Amgen, is the producer of the medical drug Erythropoietin, also called EPO. EPO has been used as a performance-enhancing drug by professional cyclists. Former professional cyclists who admitted their doping, such as Tyler Hamilton, claim that for some time most of the world's top cyclists used EPO.

A plan to perform comprehensive anti-doping tests for the 2011 event was terminated by the UCI. The plan was to do blood tests performed by the United States Anti-Doping Agency (USADA), which would have been able to detect EPO, but the UCI and the USADA couldn't agree on the details of the doping tests. For the 2013 edition, the UCI elected to reintroduce testing based on the biological passport, as USADA would also take care of pre-race testing, but with no cooperation between the two agencies.

References

External links 

Tour of California, live coverage, videos and photos: Cyclingfans.com

 
2006 establishments in California
Cycle races in the United States
Recurring sporting events established in 2006
UCI America Tour races
UCI World Tour races
Spring (season) events in the United States